The 1968 Jack Kramer Tournament of Champions was a men's professional tennis tournament played on indoor carpet courts. It was the first edition of the British Indoor Championships in the Open era. The tournament took place at the  Wembley Pool Arena in London, England and ran from 15 November through 21 November 1968.

The singles event and the accompanying £5,000 first prize was won by Ken Rosewall.

Finals

Singles
 Ken Rosewall defeated  John Newcombe 6–4, 4–6, 7–5, 6–4

Doubles

 John Newcombe /  Tony Roche defeated  Pancho Gonzales /  Andrés Gimeno 6–3, 9–7

Draws

Singles

References

Wembley Championships
Jack Kramer Tournament of Champions
Jack Kramer Tournament of Champions
Jack Kramer Tournament of Champions
Jack Kramer Tournament of Champions
Tennis in London